Uzel (or Uzel-près-l'Oust) is a commune in the Côtes-d'Armor department in Brittany in northwestern France.

The old school, in the centre of Uzel, was the scene of torture and killings by the Nazis and by the collaborationist Bezen Perrot, in 1944.

Population

The inhabitants of Uzel are known in French as uzelais.

Personalities
 Fulgence Bienvenüe, chief engineer for the Paris Métro in 1896, was born in Uzel in 1852.
 Alphonse Guépin, architect, born in Uzel in 1808.
 Yves Morvan, romanesque art specialist, born in Uzel in 1932.

See also
Communes of the Côtes-d'Armor department

References

External links

Communes of Côtes-d'Armor